Bundesautobahn 36 (translates from German as Federal Motorway 36, short form Autobahn 36, abbreviated as BAB 36 or A 36) is an autobahn in Germany. It was established on 1 January 2019 from the Bundesautobahn 395 and parts of the Bundesstraße 6.

The highway is collectively known as Nordharzautobahn (North Harz highway) due to the route being parallel to the Harz mountains from Vienenburg to Bernburg.

History 
In March 1926, a route between Seesen and Halberstadt north of the Harz mountains was first suggested as part of a greater network in Germany. More detailed plannings of parts of today's route reach back to April 1953, when a planning office in Brunswick recommended a highway-like route between Braunschweig and Bad Harzburg; this route was built between 1972 and 1994 as A 395 and replaced the B 4 along its way. This part wasn't considered a part of A 26 until discussions about upgrading the highway-like Bundesstraße 6 between Vienenburg interchange (A 395) and Bernburg (Saale) interchange (A 14) emerged in 2017 and were officially realized on 1 January 2019, leading to the renaming of the A 395 (Braunschweig – Vienenburg) and B 6 (Vienenburg – Bernburg) to A 36.

The original planning of the A 36 considered a different route: In 1972, the highway was first named as A 106 and supposed to connect Bielefeld, Lage, Hamelin, Alfeld, Goslar, and Bad Harzburg to the Inner German border. If built, this route would today connect the A 2 with a hypothetical A 35 south of Hamelin in direction of Hanover, the A 7 (Hanover – Kassel), and the A 369 (Braunschweig – Braunlage), not including the former B 6 route to the A 14.

A second planning from 1976 designated the route from Bielefeld to Hamelin as a part of the A 35, leaving the highway from Hamelin to Bad Harzburg under the official name A 36. This last official plan was the base for the later renaming, considering the B 6 as the eastward continuation of the suggested highway. This plan was eventually abandoned in 1980, with only a minor route east of the A 2 (Ubbedissen, four-lane B 6) and west of the recent A 369 (Harlingerode, four-lane B 6) being realized for the purpose of being part of a major highway.

Exit list

 

 

 

 

|}

References

External links 

036
A036
A036